Nadia Evadne Cattouse (born 2 November 1924) is a Belizean-born British actress, singer and songwriter.

She is best known for her acting roles in many British television programmes including Play for Today, Crown Court, Dixon of Dock Green and Johnny Jarvis. As a singer in the 1960s, she performed at Les Cousins folk and blues club in Greek Street, London, and appeared on television programs including the BBC’s Sing Along and Hootenanny. On the folk scene she was a contemporary of Julie Felix and Fairport Convention, and was called by Melody Maker "one of the giants of the folk-song revival in Britain". With Robin Hall and Jimmie Macgregor she made Songs of Grief & Glory (1967). Her album Earth Mother (1970) was partly recorded at the 1969 Edinburgh Festival. Among other compilations, Cattouse features on Cult Cargo: Belize City Boil Up (2005), singing "Long Time Boy", and on the 1972 album Club Folk 2 (Peg Records PS3), singing "B. C. People" and "All Around My Grandmother's Floor".

Biography

Early years and career
Nadia Evadne Cattouse was born in Belize City in 1924. Her father, Albert Cattouse, was a civil servant who went on to become Deputy Prime Minister of British Honduras.

In 1943, during the Second World War, Nadia Cattouse came to Britain as a volunteer and was trained in Edinburgh as a signals operator. She also became a part-time physical training instructor with the ATS. She subsequently attended teacher training college in Glasgow and on qualifying she went back to British Honduras, where she was headmistress of a Mission school and lectured on infant education at Teachers' Training College and summer courses. She returned to Britain in 1951 and studied social sciences at the London School of Economics, doing some acting and singing to pay her way through college. She began her television career in 1954. She appeared on two prize-winning television productions, Freedom Road: Songs of Negro Protest (1964) and There I Go, and appeared on stage as Felicity in Jean Genet′s The Blacks. Her notable songs as a folksinger included "Long Time Boy" and "Red and Green Christmas".

Personal life
She married composer/arranger David Lindup and their son Mike Lindup is the keyboard player of the jazz-funk new wave band Level 42.

Award
September 2009, Meritorious Service Award from the Government of Belize, "in recognition of her advancement of social, cultural, and political awareness among Belizeans and other Caribbean people in the UK".

Selected discography

Albums
 Nadia Cattouse (Reality, 1966)
 Earth Mother (RCA International, 1969)

Singles
 "The Boy Without a Heart" / "Long Time, Boy" (1961)
 "Run Joe" / "Bahaman Lullaby" (1961)
 "Port Mahon" / "A Little More Oil" (1965)
 "Beautiful Barbados" / "Turn Around" (Reality / RE 503)
 "It's Hard to See" / "Desert Sand" (LIV/SP/93)

Compilations
 Edinburgh Folk Festival Vol. 1 (1963)
 Edinburgh Folk Festival Vol. 2 (1964)
 Freedom Road: Songs of Negro Protest (Fontana, 1964)
 Songs from ABC Television's "Hallelujah" (Fontana, 1966)
 49 Greek Street (RCA / RCA SF8118, 1970; RCA / JASKCD193, 2007)
 Club Folk Volume 1 (Peg, 1972)
 Club Folk Volume 2 (Peg, 1972)
 Cult Cargo: Belize City Boil Up (Numero, 2005)

References

External links
 
 "Nadia Cattouse" at RYM Artists.
 Filmography at BFI
 Discography at rateyourmusic.com
 Discography at 45cat.com

1924 births
British television actresses
Living people
Belizean emigrants to the United Kingdom
British folk singers
Belizean actresses
20th-century British actresses
Belizean television actors
20th-century Belizean women
20th-century Black British women singers
Black British actresses
Auxiliary Territorial Service soldiers